The 2011 WAFU Nations Cup is an international home-based football competition. It was hosted in Nigeria. The competition is organised by the West Africa Football Union (WAFU).

All games will be played at Abeokuta and Ijebu Ode.

Participants
 
  
 
  (replaced withdrew )
 
 
  (withdrew)
  (withdrew)
  (withdrew)

Group stage

The draw for the group stage took place on April 28, 2011.

Group A

 withdrew.

Group B

 and  withdrew.

As there were only two teams left in the group, it was decided that the teams should play each other twice to determine a group winner. Both teams automatically qualified for the semi-final stage.

Knockout Phase

Semi-finals

Third place

Final

References

WAFU Nations Cup
2011 in African football
2011
Wafu
Wafu